Star Trek: Vanguard is a series of Star Trek tie-in fiction novels set during the 2260s, or the time period concurrent with Star Trek: The Original Series. The series is written by Kevin Dilmore, David Mack, and Dayton Ward.

Distant Early Warning (2006), a Star Trek: Corps of Engineers novella by Dayton Ward and Kevin Dilmore, is a prequel to Vanguard, introducing the setting and several characters. Star Trek: Seekers (2014–15), also written by Dilmore, Mack, and Ward, is sequel series.

Setting 
The books largely take place on board the Federation space station Starbase 47, also known as "Vanguard", which serves as a support facility for a colonization push by the United Federation of Planets into an interstellar expanse called the Taurus Reach. While the station does in fact help colonies across the area, its true mission (known only to a few people) is to study a mystery that began with the discovery of genetically engineered DNA millions of times more complex than any previously encountered, known as the Taurus Meta-Genome.

In its effort to understand the Meta-Genome, Starbase 47 has three vessels permanently assigned to it, the Constitution-class cruiser USS Endeavour, the tiny Archer-class scout USS Sagittarius, and the Daedalus-class Starfleet Corps of Engineers starship USS Lovell. Another starship, the USS Bombay, was destroyed during the events of Harbinger. In addition to the mission, those who know of Vanguard's true nature must also prevent others from becoming aware of the situation, especially the Klingon Empire and the Tholian Assembly, both of whom have interests in the region and are suspicious of the Federation's presence.

While the majority of the characters featured in the first novels are original to this series, the Vulcan lieutenant commander T'Prynn appeared in two other Star Trek novels—the Lost Era novel The Art of the Impossible by Keith DeCandido, and Deep Space Nine novels Lesser Evil, by Robert Simpson, and Unity, by S. D. Perry. In addition, petty officer Razka (from the third novel Reap the Whirlwind) first appears in the Next Generation novel A Time to Kill by David Mack, and Carol Marcus from The Wrath of Khan appears at the end of the same novel.

Novels 
Declassified (2011) is an anthology of four novellas. In Tempest's Wake (2012) was published as an ebook exclusive.

Seekers (2014–15) 
Star Trek: Seekers is a continuation of Vanguard.

Related novels

See also 
 List of Star Trek novels

References

External links 
 
 

Book series introduced in 2005
Vanguard
Vanguard
Science fiction book series